Mehranrud may refer to:
Mehranrud-e Jonubi Rural District
Mehranrud-e Markazi Rural District